Maharanga is a genus of flowering plants belonging to the family Boraginaceae.

Its native range is Himalaya to Southern Central China and Northern Thailand.

Species:

Maharanga bhutanica 
Maharanga bicolor 
Maharanga borii 
Maharanga dumetorum 
Maharanga egregia 
Maharanga emodi 
Maharanga lycopsioides 
Maharanga microstoma 
Maharanga squamulifera 
Maharanga verruculosa

References

Boraginoideae
Boraginaceae genera